TerraTech is a construction sandbox game with action elements created and released by British developer Payload Studios on 10 August 2018 for Windows and Xbox One and four days later for PlayStation 4. A port to Nintendo Switch by Lab42 was released on 29 May 2019. The game focuses on interplanetary mining operations. Players build and operate vehicles, called Techs, and stationary bases to extract resources and fight rival prospectors.

Gameplay 
A construction sandbox focusing on vehicular combat and resource management, the game offers a variety of blocks with different functions that can be combined in various ways using attach points on each, with the control block - a cab - always serving as a centrepoint. Wheel blocks in contact with ground enable driving, while wing blocks generate lift for flying and other blocks provide additional functions to the tech they are attached to. Weapons deal damage, and shields and fields protect from damage and/or apply effects, such as restoring part durability. Beside vehicles, the game enables construction of static bases anchored to the ground that are mainly used for storage and crafting. Blocks can be crafted using resources gathered from the environment and a system of resource silos, conveyors and automatic factories (all blocks themselves). Such special components can excavate, process, transfer and sell resources, but some of these work only on stationary builds (bases).

The environment consists of biomes, each with different objects such as trees and rocks. Destroying these yields resources, from wood to minerals. Veins can be found and exploited by building stationary mining equipment on top of them.

Trading stations in the world can sell players blocks, issue missions and buy resources from players. Players can also sell resources with "selling cannons" which blast resources into orbit where they are supposedly collected.

Multiple factions (called Corporations) exist in the game world, each having a distinctive style of blocks and associated playstyle. For example, GSO has starter-grade parts that don't have particular strength; GeoCorp focuses on heavy structures and mining technology, but doesn't produce weapons; Venture produces light, high-speed vehicles; Hawkeye is focused on combat, providing superior weapons and armour; Better Future has a focus on futuristic technology, like advanced movement parts, control blocks and versatile weapons; Reticule Research provides experimental weapons and equipment. The player is free to match blocks from all corporations in a vehicle.

Several modes are available:
 Campaign: a loose storyline in which the player is an interplanetary prospector tasked to gather resources for famished Earth. The player starts with a cab and a handful of GSO blocks on a procedurally generated map, fighting rival prospectors and taking their blocks, unlocking licenses of various factions which enable them to acquire higher-level blocks. In this mode, resources and blocks can be sold for the in-game currency "Block Bucks" and spent for purchasing new blocks.
 Creative: unlimited blocks and optional enemies, for building and testing constructions without having to acquire resources
 Sumo: tech vs. tech battles in an arena

Development 
The developers worked the concept into a playable demo in 2014 and presented it at indie games shows such as Rezzed, as well as actively promoted it through Steam, IndieDB, Twitch and other web platforms. A successful Kickstarter crowdfunding campaign followed after which an open beta was released as early access on the Steam platform. After a protracted development period, the version 1.0 was officially released in August 2018.

Despite being released, the game remains in active development, and several major new features are planned.

Reception 

Reviewers compared the gameplay to playing with Lego bricks, which they considered exciting and invoking of childhood memories. User interface, controls and the game AI, on the other hand, were less commended. The reviewer for AbsoluteXbox was particularly critical of unintuitive camera controls, clumsy driving performance and frustrating combat in the Xbox version.

References

External links 
 
 Official wiki

2018 video games
Construction and management simulation games
Nintendo Switch games
Open-world video games
PlayStation 4 games
Video games developed in the United Kingdom
Windows games
Xbox One games